Sherrington is a village and parish in Wiltshire, England.

Sherrington may also refer to:

Places
 Saint-Patrice-de-Sherrington, Quebec, Canada
 Sherrington (crater), a small impact crater on the far side of the Moon

People
 Billy Sherrington (1890–1977), English football manager
 Bob Sherrington (1902–1966), Australian politician
 Charles Scott Sherrington (1857–1952), English medical scientist, Nobel prize winner
Sherrington's law of reciprocal innervation in muscle
 Vulpian–Heidenhain–Sherrington phenomenon in skeletal muscle
 Chris Sherrington (born 1983), English judo practitioner
 David Sherrington (born 1961), English cricketer
 Georgina Sherrington (born 1985), English actress
 John Sherrington (born 1958), Auxiliary Bishop of Westminster, England

See also
 Sherington, village and parish in Buckinghamshire, England